The men's light heavyweight (81 kg/178.2 lbs) Full-Contact category at the W.A.K.O. European Championships 2004 in Budva was the fourth heaviest of the male Full-Contact tournaments and involved eight participants.  Each of the matches was three rounds of two minutes each and were fought under Full-Contact kickboxing rules.

The tournament gold medallist was Maxim Voronov from Russia who defeated Pole Bogumil Polonski in the final by unanimous decision in what would be a European and world double for Voronov who also won at the last W.A.K.O. world championships.  Hannes Perk and Patrik Sjöstrand, from Estonia and Sweden respectively, took the bronze medal positions.

Results

Key

See also
List of WAKO Amateur European Championships
List of WAKO Amateur World Championships
List of male kickboxers

References

External links
 WAKO World Association of Kickboxing Organizations Official Site

W.A.K.O. European Championships 2004 (Budva)